Bulverde is a city in Comal County, Texas, United States. Bulverde is known for its  small-town, slow pace of life, coupled with the German emigrant history of the town's founders. Bulverde was originally named Piepers Settlement after a prominent German pioneer. Its population was 5,692 at the 2020 census, up from 4,630 at the 2010 census. It is part of the San Antonio metropolitan statistical area.

Geography
U.S. Route 281 passes through the east side of Bulverde, leading south to San Antonio and north  to Blanco. Cibolo Creek, which forms the Comal County/Bexar County line, runs just south of Bulverde.

Demographics

As of the 2020 United States census, 5,692 people, 1,885 households, and 1,534 families were residing in the city.

As of the census of 2000, 3,761 people, 1,292 households, and 1,131 families were residing in the city. The population density was 495.7 people per square mile (191.3/km2). The 1,349 housing units had an average density of 177.8 per square mile (68.6/km2). The racial makeup of the city was 95.32% White, 0.32% African American, 0.32% Native American, 0.51% Asian, 1.81% from other races, and 1.70% from two or more races. Hispanics or Latinos of any race were 10.95% of the population.

Of the 1,292 households, 41.6% had children under 18 living with them, 79.6% were married couples living together, 5.7% had a female householder with no husband present, and 12.4% were not families; 10.1% of all households were made up of individuals, and 3.6% had someone living alone who was 65 or older. The average household size was 2.91 and the average family size was 3.12.

In the city, the age distribution was 28.3% under 18, 5.2% from 18 to 24, 27.7% from 25 to 44, 29.2% from 45 to 64, and 9.6% who were 65 or older. The median age was 40 years. For every 100 females, there were 101.3 males. For every 100 females 18 and over, there were 96.4 males.

The median income for a household in the city was $67,055, and for a family was $68,019. Males had a median income of $49,245 versus $30,717 for females. The per capita income for the city was $26,887. About 1.5% of families and 2.3% of the population were below the poverty line, including none of those under 18 or 65 or over.

History

Bulverde's first people were Native Americans. A type of arrowhead known as the Bulverde Point is named after the style of arrowhead made by Native Americans who lived in the area during the period 2,500 to 600 BCE.

Sometimes called the "Front Porch of the Texas Hill Country", Bulverde was settled in 1850 and called Pieper Settlement after Anton Pieper. It was mainly settled by German immigrants similar to nearby New Braunfels. For many years, the closest post office was at Smithson Valley, and mail was delivered once a week to the house of Carl Koch in Bulverde. A local post office that operated from 1879 to 1919 was named for Luciano Bulverdo, an early area landowner.

Between 1996 and 1999, five separate municipalities were incorporated and combined in the Bulverde area to form the current City of Bulverde. This process required 22 separate elections.  In May 2015, the people of Bulverde voted to adopt a home-rule charter to have more control over development.

Education

Bulverde is served by the Comal Independent School District.

Throughout the 1980s and as of 2021, the children of Bulverde fed into Smithson Valley High School. The sports teams from the high school regularly advanced to compete at state championship levels.

Zoned schools:
 Rahe Bulverde, Johnson Ranch, Arlon Seay, and Bill Brown elementary schools
 Most residents are in the Spring Branch Middle School zone, while some are in the Smithson Valley middle zone
 Smithson Valley High School

A private school, Living Rock Academy (LRA), opened its doors in August 2015. The school is the result of a group effort by local parents of fundamental Bible-teaching churches after they split off from Bracken Christian School. LRA, home of the Bobcats, hosts students in K4–12th grade.

The Bracken Christian School (BCS), a K4–12th school, was founded in 1983. Bracken has gone to the playoffs in football almost every year since 2006. They partner with Christian families to educate students according to a Biblical worldview.

Notable people

 Donald H. Balch, a United States Air Force general, died here in 2007.
 Felix "Doc" Blanchard ("Mr. Inside"), 1945 Heisman Trophy winner, died of pneumonia on April 19, 2009, in Bulverde.
 Scott Casey, WCCW pro wrestler
 Taylor Hagler, racing driver
 Jason LaRue, Major League Baseball player
 Nathan Macias, Republican former member of the Texas House of Representatives from Comal County
 Augie Meyers, musician and singer, former member of Sir Douglas Quintet, and Texas Tornados

Business
Futurex, an information technology company founded in 1981.

Climate
The climate in this area is characterized by hot, humid summers and generally mild to cool winters.  According to the Köppen climate classification, Bulverde has a humid subtropical climate, Cfa on climate maps.

References

External links
 City of Bulverde official website
 

Cities in Texas
Cities in Comal County, Texas
Greater San Antonio
Populated places established in 1850
1850 establishments in Texas